Smicripidae is a family of beetles, in the superfamily Cucujoidea. The common name for this family is palmetto beetles. The family only has one extant genus, Smicrips, with six extant species native to tropical and subtropical regions of the Americas and extinct species from the Eocene of Europe and one extinct genus, Mesosmicrips, known from the mid Cretaceous (earliest Cenomanian) aged Burmese amber. Smicrips larvae are usually found amongst decaying vegetation, while adults are typically found on inflorescences (flower clusters), especially those of Arecaceae (palms), although associations with flowers of Fabaceae (legumes), Passifloraceae, Bombacaceae and Cactaceae (cactus) have also been recorded. Their diet is unknown.

References

External links

Cucujoidea families